Texas Lightning may refer to:

 Texas Lightning (band), a German country music quintet
 Texas Lightning (film), a 1981 film directed by Gary Graver
 Texas Lightning (soccer), a U.S. soccer club, later the Dallas Lightning